= Pachdevara =

Village in Uttar Pradesh, India

Pachdevara is a village in Prayagraj, Uttar Pradesh, India.
